Yves Eigenrauch (born 24 April 1971) is a German former professional footballer who played mainly as a right back.

Football career
Eigenrauch was born in Minden, North Rhine-Westphalia. After beginning his career with Arminia Bielefeld, he went on to spend 12 years with FC Schalke 04, being regularly used during nine of his first ten. He contributed with eight matches in the club's victorious run in the UEFA Cup in 1996–97.

After two injured-ravaged seasons from 2000 to 2002 (no Bundesliga appearances in the latter), Eigenrauch retired from the game at the age of 31.

Honours
Schalke 04
DFB-Pokal: 2000–01
UEFA Cup: 1996–97

References

External links
 
 

1971 births
Living people
German footballers
Association football defenders
Bundesliga players
2. Bundesliga players
Arminia Bielefeld players
FC Schalke 04 players
UEFA Cup winning players
People from Minden
Sportspeople from Detmold (region)
Footballers from North Rhine-Westphalia
West German footballers